Dartford Grammar School is a selective secondary (ages 11–19) foundation school for boys in Dartford, Kent, England, which admits girls to its sixth form (ages 16–18). All of the students joining the school are considered to be from the top 25% of the ability range, as determined by the 11-Plus examinations. The students come from Dartford, neighbouring towns and villages, and nearby London boroughs, as well as an increasing number of students from Essex. The current roll is 1,203, including 461 in the sixth form. It is the brother school of Dartford Grammar School for Girls.

History
The school was founded in 1576 by Edward Gwyn, a merchant; William Vaughan, a philanthropist and landowner; and William Death.
     
A 1660 document outlined the original terms for the founding of the school:

"William Vaughan, Edward Gwyn and William Death donated land and property near the Market House in Dartford High Street, the profits from which were to be used for maintaining a school and for and towards the supporting of one honest sufficient and learned man in grammar, as to them should seem fit and convenient, to be elected, chosen, and approved of, for the teaching, instructing and eruditing of children in the town of Dartford, in the knowledge of grammar, as heretofore has been used according to the charitable and pious interests and meaning of the said William Vaughan, Edward Gwyn and William Death re: 24th March 18 Elizabeth I."

Lessons were initially given in the High Street above the Corn Market house, which was demolished in 1769. The school moved to its present location in 1864.

Following the school's 'Outstanding' Ofsted inspection in 2008, the school was able to choose a third specialism, following Language College Status and the IB Programme; the school chose Science, resulting in an increased budget available next financial year. In 2011, the school chose to adopt the status of an Academy, which would provide extra funding to the school, although no name change was required.

Academic performance
In 2014, 64% of Year 11 students gained 7 or more grades A/A* in GCSE exams. The school came second in the School Rankings for the new English Bacc in 2010. Most of Year 13 students proceed to university, with a majority gaining their first or second choice of university.

As of 2007, the school has been awarded the right to teach the International Baccalaureate Middle Years Programme, becoming the first school in Britain and the first state school in the world to teach the course.

In 2019, The school achieved the top IB results in the country for the second time.

The school was rated "Outstanding" in its last Ofsted inspection in 2008 and will not be inspected again unless concerns are raised about its performance in an interim assessment.

Locations and buildings
The school currently is located on Shepherds Lane, Dartford at the top of West Hill. The original 1864 school house (facing Dartford Road) is now known as the Hardy Building, named after the novelist Thomas Hardy who was an assistant architect to Arthur Blomfield, the architect who designed the building. The original field has since been built on with additional blocks, starting with the science block in 1928, since renamed the Stephenson building after the former head of Science, Brian Stephenson, followed by most of the remaining buildings in 1940. A three-floored classroom building is named after Major Harold Pochin, Headmaster from 1920 to 1946.

Other buildings include the Gwyn building, named after Edward Gwyn, one of the school founders, containing technology and business teaching rooms, as well as the Kaika (Sixth Form) centre, where five new teaching rooms were opened in 2008, mainly for sixth form use, named the John Field Suite after the late chair of the governors. The Beckets Sports Centre is shared with the public in agreement with the school, in the same way as The Mick Jagger Centre, a £2.2 million development financed with National Lottery funding by the Arts Council of England. The Mick Jagger Centre was opened in March 2000 by The Duke of Kent, and hosts a number of performing arts events. From Summer 2009 to Spring 2010, the Mick Jagger Centre and part of the Pochin and Stephenson blocks underwent a major redevelopment, which provided a new drama studio, new science laboratories, a food technology lab, a new staff room, new art rooms and classrooms. In 2014 to 2015, the Mick Jagger Centre was redeveloped to include several new classrooms and new music practice rooms. From 2017 to 2018, the school expanded their sixth-form centre with two new computer rooms and a quiet study area.

House system
The students are divided into five Houses:
D'Aeth (Yellow)
Gwyn (Purple)
Havelock (Red)
Vaughan (Green)
Wilson (Blue)
         
The House system was introduced in 1916 with four Houses (Gwyn House being added in 1997). D’Aeth, Gwyn and Vaughan are named after the three founders of the School; Havelock is named after the British General Henry Havelock, a former student at the school, and Wilson is named after another distinguished former pupil, Sir Erasmus Wilson.

Notable former pupils   

Former pupils of the school are known as Old Dartfordians

Henry Havelock (1795–1857), general
William James Erasmus Wilson (1809–84), surgeon
Henry Ambrose Hunt (1866–1946), meteorologist
Thomas Pullinger (1867–1945), automotive engineer
Alec Stock (1917–2001), footballer
Sidney Keyes (1922–43), poet
Derek Ufton (1928–2021), Charlton Athletic, England footballer, Kent CCC
Denis Haydon (1930–88), membrane biophysicist
Terence Frisby (born 1932), playwright and novelist
Dave Godin (1936–2004), music journalist
Michael Pearson (1936–2017), clock historian and author
Graham Smith (born 1938), milliner
Mick Jagger (born 1943), rock musician (vocalist of The Rolling Stones)
Dick Taylor (born 1943), guitarist and founder member, The Pretty Things
Brian Pendleton (1944–2001), rhythm guitarist, The Pretty Things
John Rushby, computer scientist
 Bill Mitchell (1951–2017), founder of site-specific theatre company Wildworks.
Charlie Whiting (1952–2019), Formula One race director.
Frank Baker (born 1961), British ambassador
Gareth Johnson (born 1969), Conservative MP for Dartford
Min Patel (born 1970), international cricketer
Matt Morgan (born 1977), comedian
Topsy Ojo (born 1985), rugby player, London Irish fullback
Thomas Frake (born 1988), winner of the MasterChef 2020 UK TV show competition.
Adam Gemili (born 1993), athlete
Semi Ajayi (born 1993), professional footballer

References

External links
Official website
Ofsted Report

Boys' schools in Kent
Educational institutions established in the 1570s
Grammar schools in Kent
Dartford
1576 establishments in England
Academies in Kent
International Baccalaureate schools in England
Arthur Blomfield buildings